Aqa Jan Bolaghi (also Romanized as Āqā Jān Bolāghī) is a village in Chaharduli Rural District, in the Central District of Asadabad County, Hamadan Province, Iran. At the 2006 census, its population was 274, in 65 families.

References 

Populated places in Asadabad County